The Black & Blue Festival is a gay-benefit dance festival held in Montreal, Canada, every Canadian Thanksgiving weekend, which raises money for HIV/AIDS and the gay community. It is organized annually by the Bad Boy Club Montréal. The various events attract up to 70,000 participants as at 2010.

See also
List of electronic music festivals
Bal en Blanc

References

Music festivals established in 1991
Music festivals in Montreal
LGBT culture in Montreal
October events
LGBT dance
Electronic music festivals in Canada
Circuit parties
LGBT festivals in Canada
1991 establishments in Quebec